Trentepohlia is a genus of filamentous chlorophyte green algae in the family Trentepohliaceae, living free on terrestrial supports such as tree trunks and wet rocks or symbiotically in lichens. The filaments of Trentepohlia have a strong orange colour (photograph at right) caused by the presence of large quantities of carotenoid pigments which mask the green of the chlorophyll.

Trentepohlia species form associations with fungal hyphae, and are widespread phycobionts in lichens, such as the "secret writing" crustose lichen genera Graphis, Graphina, Gyalecta and Opegrapha.

There are about 40 species of Trentepohlia mostly distributed in tropical and subtropical areas but several species also occur in temperate environments including Britain and Ireland. The genus is present in almost all continents.

The genus was circumscribed by Carl Friedrich Philipp von Martius in Fl. Crypt. Erlang. on page 351 in 1817.

The genus name of Trentepohlia is in honour of Johann Friedrich Trentepohl (1748–1806), who was a German clergyman and botanist. He worked as a lecturer and Pastor in various places in Wesermarsch.

Gallery

References

Ulvophyceae genera
Trentepohliaceae